Konstantynów Łódzki  is a town in Pabianice County, Łódź Voivodeship, Poland, with 18,335 inhabitants (2020). It borders Lodz to the east, Lutomiersk to the West, Aleksandrow Lodzki to the North, and Porszewice to the South. It was incorporated in 1924, but was founded in the 1820s by a landowner who had planned to build a textile industry there.

In 1821 Konstantynów Łódzki, at that time still a village, became a part of the textile industry of the Łódź region. Shortly thereafter, in 1824 the town was given its current name and was established as a town in 1830.

Notable residents
Krzysztof Matyjaszewski (born 1950), Polish-American chemist, Wolf Prize winner

References

External links
 
 Konstantynów Łódzki chapter of the Encyclopedia of Jewish Communities in Poland, Volume I (Poland)

  Konstantynow Lodzki Jewish Cemetery Restoration.

Cities and towns in Łódź Voivodeship
Pabianice County